The 2019 President's Cup was a professional tennis tournament played on outdoor hard courts. It was the fourteenth (ATP) and eleventh (ITF) editions of the tournament and was part of the 2019 ATP Challenger Tour and the 2019 ITF Women's World Tennis Tour. It took place in Nur-Sultan, Kazakhstan, on 15–21 July 2019.

Men's singles main draw entrants

Seeds

 1 Rankings are as of 1 July 2019.

Other entrants
The following players received wildcards into the singles main draw:
  Sergey Fomin
  Andrey Golubev
  Marsel İlhan
  Grigoriy Lomakin
  Dostanbek Tashbulatov

The following player received entry into the singles main draw using a protected ranking:
  Nicolás Barrientos

The following player received entry into the singles main draw as an alternate:
  Michael Vrbenský

The following players received entry into the singles main draw using their ITF World Tennis Ranking:
  Sanjar Fayziev
  Konstantin Kravchuk
  Nikolás Sánchez Izquierdo
  Shuichi Sekiguchi
  Evgenii Tiurnev

The following players received entry from the qualifying draw:
  Vladyslav Manafov
  Luca Margaroli

Women's singles main draw entrants

Seeds

 1 Rankings are as of 1 July 2019

Other entrants
The following players received wildcards into the singles main draw:
  Gozal Ainitdinova
  Dariya Detkovskaya
  Yekaterina Dmitrichenko
  Zhibek Kulambayeva

The following players received entry from the qualifying draw:
  Vlada Ekshibarova
  Vlada Koval
  İpek Öz
  Ksenia Palkina
  Iryna Shymanovich
  Shalimar Talbi
  Marianna Zakarlyuk
  Anastasia Zakharova

The following player received entry as a lucky loser:
  Ng Kwan-yau

Champions

Men's singles

 Evgeny Donskoy def.  Sebastian Korda, 7–6(7–5), 3–6, 6–4

Women's singles

 Marie Bouzková def.  Natalija Kostić, 6–3, 6–3

Men's doubles

 Andrey Golubev /  Aleksandr Nedovyesov def.  Chung Yun-seong /  Nam Ji-sung 6–4, 6–4.

Women's doubles

 Marie Bouzková /  Vivian Heisen def.  Vlada Koval /  Kamilla Rakhimova, 7–6(10–8), 6–1

References

External links 
 2019 President's Cup at ITFtennis.com
 Official website

2019 ITF Women's World Tennis Tour
2019 ATP Challenger Tour
2019 in Kazakhstani sport
Tennis tournaments in Kazakhstan
2019
July 2019 sports events in Asia